is a passenger railway station in located in the city of  Hirakata, Osaka Prefecture, Japan, operated by the private railway company Keihan Electric Railway.

Lines
Miyanosaka Station is a station of the Keihan Katano Line, and is located 1.0 kilometers from the terminus of the line at Hirakatashi Station.

Station layout
The station has two elevated opposed side platforms with the station building underneath.

Platforms

Adjacent stations

History
It was renamed to its present name on June 20, 1971.

Passenger statistics
In fiscal 2019, the station was used by an average of 6,153 passengers daily.

Surrounding area
Kudara-dera ruins
Kudara Shrine
Osaka Prefectural Psychiatric Medical Center

See also
List of railway stations in Japan

References

External links

Official home page 

Railway stations in Osaka Prefecture
Railway stations in Japan opened in 1940
Hirakata, Osaka